The 1873 Rutgers Queensmen football team represented Rutgers University in the 1873 college football season. Rutgers lost to Yale and split two games with Columbia.

Schedule

References

Rutgers
Rutgers Scarlet Knights football seasons
Rutgers Queensmen football